Emilio García Montoya (born 24 October 1994), known as Emilio García, is a Mexican footballer who most recently played for Pachuca.

Career

Professional 
García began his career with Pachuca, spending time on loan with Estudiantes Tecos and Tlaxcala in Mexico, before transferring on loan to United Soccer League side Rio Grande Valley FC Toros on March 26, 2016.

References

External links
 
 
 

1994 births
Living people
Sportspeople from Tijuana
Footballers from Baja California
Association football midfielders
Mexican footballers
C.F. Pachuca players
Tecos F.C. footballers
Tlaxcala F.C. players
Rio Grande Valley FC Toros players
Mexican expatriate footballers
Expatriate soccer players in the United States
Mexican expatriate sportspeople in the United States
Liga MX players
USL Championship players